The Secretary of the Democratic Party is the leader of the Democratic Party, the main centre-left political party in Italy.

Secretaries

Secretary tenure

Secretaries timeline

Deputy secretaries

Deputy secretary tenure

Deputy secretaries timeline

References

Democratic Party (Italy) politicians